Limnochares aquatica is a species of arachnid belonging to the family Limnocharidae. It is native to Eurasia and North America.

References

Trombidiformes